Saggart is a village in South Dublin, Ireland, south west of Dublin city. It lies between the N7 (Naas Road), Rathcoole, Citywest and Tallaght.  It is one of the fastest-growing settlements in Ireland, showing a population increase of 46.1% between 2011 and 2016.

Name
A monk called Mosacra founded a settlement on the site of the village in the 7th century. The name Saggart derives from Teach Sacra which means 'house of Sacra' in Irish.

History
A monastery existed just outside the village in the 7th century. The remains of this monastery are found on the grounds of an equestrian centre approximately 1.5 km from today's Saggart Village. After St Mosacra died, it became a nunnery with over 80 nuns living there until the Viking attacks of the 9th century.

By 1207, Saggart, or Tasagart, as it was then called by the Normans, had been made a prebend of the Cathedral of St. Patrick. In 1615, the church was reported as being in good repair but fifteen years later the church is stated to have fallen down, and the Protestant parishioners attended Rathcoole church. The current church was built in 1847.

From 1888–1932, the Dublin to Blessington tram service stopped at Saggart.

Historical artifacts
Several objects of archaeological interest are located in Saggart, including a pair of megalithic standing stones in Boherboy, that are known locally as Adam and Eve. Nearby is the Raheen Standing Stone, a megalithic standing stone in a field on the Blessington Road, near Crooksling.

Nature
Saggart lies at the northern end of a mountain valley, the Slade of Saggart, with Brittas at the other side. The River Camac flows through this valley, passing around the village on the way to meet the River Liffey by Heuston Station. The great spotted woodpecker, Ireland's newest breeding bird, has been seen here.

Religion
The Roman Catholic parish boundaries include the areas of Rathcoole and Brittas and the parish works in conjunction with the neighbouring parish of St. Finian's, Newcastle. Dedicated in 1849, the Roman Catholic Church is named after "The Nativity of the Blessed Virgin Mary". The current Parish Priest is Fr. John Gilligan.

Amenities
Saggart is a heritage village. It is also home to the Citywest Hotel, which hosts many annual events including the Irish Masters, award ceremonies, and political ard fheiseanna. Citywest Business Campus is located just to the north of Saggart village and is home to many companies. The Citywest Shopping Centre, anchored by Dunnes Stores, is the only major shopping centre in the area and has a pharmacy, cafes and a range of other shops. There is also a service/petrol station, restaurants and a 4,000-seat convention centre at Citywest. The Citywest Business Campus also includes a Dublin City University facility. Jacob’s Bar was established as a public house in the village by members of the Jacob family in 1901.

A new walking trail incorporating the Slade Valley is expected to be completed in the coming years. The section of the trail adjacent to Saggart Reservoir is currently under construction and runs alongside the boundary of the site. The development of the Slade Valley trail was marked as one of the Key Actions under the South Dublin County Council Tourism Strategy 2015-2020 where it is intended to take in Rathcoole, Saggart and Brittas with looped access to villages and other attractions.

Transport

Luas
Saggart Luas stop is one of two western termini for the Luas Red Line, the other being Tallaght. The line provides a direct link to Dublin city with a journey duration of 45 minutes.

Bus
Saggart is served by the Dublin Bus route number 69.

Sport
St. Marys is the local Gaelic Athletic Association club and was founded in 1906.

Coolmine Equestrian Centre was established here in 1989. The equestrian centre is home to the remains of the 7th-century monastery of St Mo Sacra. The centre and CEAD-Ireland host equestrian activities and competitions and CEAD-Fest during the summer months.

Politics
For elections to Dáil Éireann, Saggart is part of the Dublin Mid-West constituency. Saggart, along with Citywest, Rathcoole and Newcastle, is part of the Clondalkin Local Electoral District of South Dublin County Council.

See also
 List of towns and villages in Ireland

References

External links
 South Dublin County History
 South Dublin County Images

 
Towns and villages in South Dublin (county)
Places in South Dublin (county)
Civil parishes of Newcastle, County Dublin